Ephebe lanata is a species of filamentous lichen in the family Lichinaceae, and the type species of the genus Ephebe. The lichen was first described as a new species by Swedish taxonomist Carl Linnaeus in his seminal 1753 work Species Plantarum, as Lichen lanatus. Finnish lichenologist Edvard August Vainio transferred it to Ephebe in 1888. In North America, it is known colloquially as the "rockshag lichen".

References

Lichinomycetes
Lichen species
Fungi of Europe
Fungi of North America
Lichens described in 1753
Taxa named by Carl Linnaeus